Erich Mückenberger (1910 in Chemnitz – 1998 in Berlin) was a German socialist politician. He began his political career in the Social Democratic Party of Germany (SPD). He became a member of the Socialist Unity Party of Germany (SED) when the East German branches of SPD and the Communist Party of Germany merged after the Second World War. Mückenberger was one of the most high-ranking former Social Democrats in the German Democratic Republic and held several positions in the SED.

Early life and political activism
Mückenberger spent his childhood in Chemnitz. He later worked there as a machine-fitter apprentice. In 1924 he joined the Social Democratic youth organization. In 1927 he became a SPD member. Mückenberger became an activist of its paramilitary wing, Reichsbanner. After the National Socialist takeover, he engaged in underground resistance against the new regime. In 1935 he was arrested and sent to the Sachsenhausen concentration camp. He was released after several months. In 1938 he was again arrested and was put in jail for ten months. In 1942 he was drafted to the German military and sent to the frontline. He was an English prisoner of war from April to August 1945.

Political career in the GDR
After returning home in 1945, Mückenberger again became active in the SPD. Through the merger of SPD and KPD in the Soviet Occupation Zone, Mückenberger became a SED member. He became First Secretary of the SED Party District Organization in Saxony in 1948. Mückenberger then served as First Secretary of the Thuringia Party District Organization of SED 1949–1952. As the Thuringia District was divided along the geographic reorganization of the German Democratic Republic, Mückenberger became First Secretary of the Erfurt Party District Organization (one of the districts created out of the Thuringia organization). He remained as the First Secretary of the Erfurt SED District until 1953.

Mückenberger became a candidate member of the politburo of SED in 1950. He was one of four former SPD members that were represented in the SED politburo. In July 1953 he was included in the Central Committee secretariat. He remained in the CC secretariat until January 1963. He became a full politburo member in July 1958.

Mückenberger became First Secretary of the Frankfurt/Oder Party District Organization of SED in 1961. He stepped down in 1971 and was replaced by the then Second Secretary Hans-Joachim Hertwig. In the same year, he was appointed as the Chairman of the influential SED Central Control Commission, the party organ regulating party memberships. In 1978, he was elected chairman of the German-Soviet Friendship Society. In 1980, he was elected as the head of the SED parliamentary group in the Volkskammer (the national parliament of the GDR). Mückenberger remained in the SED politburo until November 1989.

During his political life, Erich Mückenberger participated as a speaker in the remembrance events for the liberation of the Buchenwald concentration camp at the National Memorial of the GDR.

Later life
Mückenberger was expelled from the Socialist Unity Party of Germany/Party of Democratic Socialism (SED-PDS) on 21 November 1990. Following the German reunification, Mückenberger was put on trial for shootings at the Berlin Wall, a process that Mückenberger himself dubbed as 'victors' justice'. Mückenberger was allowed to withdraw from the trial in 1996, due to ill health.

Works 

 Die politische Massenarbeit im Dorf und die nächsten Aufgaben der Landwirtschaft. Berlin 1954.
 Kommunisten werden im Kampf erzogen. Berlin 1980.
 Der Menschheit ein Leben in Frieden. Ausgewählte Reden und Aufsätze, Berlin 1985.

References

1910 births
1998 deaths
People from Chemnitz
People from the Kingdom of Saxony
Social Democratic Party of Germany politicians
Members of the Politburo of the Central Committee of the Socialist Unity Party of Germany
Members of the Provisional Volkskammer
Members of the 1st Volkskammer
Members of the 2nd Volkskammer
Members of the 3rd Volkskammer
Members of the 4th Volkskammer
Members of the 5th Volkskammer
Members of the 6th Volkskammer
Members of the 7th Volkskammer
Members of the 8th Volkskammer
Members of the 9th Volkskammer
Reichsbanner Schwarz-Rot-Gold members
German resistance members
Sachsenhausen concentration camp survivors
Recipients of the Patriotic Order of Merit (honor clasp)